Lac Bleu de Lesponne is a lake in Hautes-Pyrénées, France. At an elevation of 1977 m, its surface area is 0.51 km².

Lakes of Hautes-Pyrénées